In Hindustani music (North Indian classical music), a gharānā is a system of social organisation in the Indian subcontinent, linking musicians or dancers by lineage or apprenticeship, and more importantly by adherence to a particular musical style.

The word gharana comes from the Hindi word 'ghar' which is derived from the Sanskrit word Griha, which means 'house'. It typically refers to the place where the musical ideology originated; for example, some of the gharanas well known for singing khyals are: Dilli(Delhi), Agra, Gwalior, Indore, Atrauli-Jaipur, Kirana and Patiala. Four famous kathak gharanas are: Lucknow, Atrauli-Jaipur, Benares and Raigarh.

Vocal gharanas

Khyal gharanas

The gharana system in khyal was rooted in the guru–shishya tradition and was similar to the Dhrupad Bani system. The gharana system was greatly influenced by the gradual fall of the Mughal Empire, which forced musicians to move from Delhi to princely states such as Gwalior, Lucknow, Hyderabad, Patiala and Rampur.

The gharanas have distinct styles of presenting the khyal — how much to emphasize and how to enunciate the words of the composition, when to sing the sthayi and antara, whether to sing an unmetered alap in the beginning, what kinds of improvisations to use, how much importance to give to the rhythmic aspect, and so on. However, an individual performer from a gharana may choose to borrow appealing stylistic aspects of another gharana in his or her gayaki (singing style). There are ten prominent khyal gharanas, and they are:

Dhrupad gharanas

The dhrupad tradition includes four original styles:
 Dagarbani ("sadharani geeti")
 Gauharbani
 Khandarbani
 Nauharbani

Today's surviving dhrupad traditions are descendants of the aforementioned four styles.

 Dagar gharana, founded by the Dagar family
 Bishnupur gharana, founded by Kirtankars in West Bengal (13th century)
 Darbhanga gharana, founded in Darbhanga, Bihar
 Bettiah gharana, founded in Bettiah, Bihar
 Talwandi gharana
 Mewati gharana, founded by Wahid Khan (Beenkar) and Ghagge Nazir Khan. Descended from Khandarbani gharana.
 Kalpi gharana

Thumri gharanas
In the Benares gharana, the words in the text of a song are musically embellished to bring out their meaning, while the Lucknow gharana presents intricately embellished and delicate thumris that are explicit in their eroticism. The principal feature of the thumri of the Patiala gharana is its incorporation of the tappa from the Punjab region. It is with this tappa element that the Patiala gharana makes its impact, departing from the khyal-dominated Benares thumris and the dance-oriented Lucknow thumris. The Benares gharana was founded by Kirtankars in the 13th century and revived by Siddheshwari Devi, Rasoolan Bai, Badi Moti Bai, Mahadev Mishra, Girija Devi (mid-20th century) and Savita Devi.

Instrumental gharanas

Tabla gharanas

The following are the six widely accepted gharanas (ordered based on chronology of founding):
 Delhi gharana is the oldest of the tabla gharanas
 Ajrara gharana is an offshoot of and closely associated with the Delhi Gharana
 Lucknow gharana has rhythmic development through Kathak
 Benares gharana
 Punjab gharana, popularized by Alla Rakha and Zakir Husain, developed through its original Pakhavaj repertoire
 Farrukhabad gharana is the youngest accepted tabla gharana, and an offshoot of all of the Gharanas, featuring their main concepts

Wind and string instruments 
 Bishnupur gharana
 Sufiana gharana of Kashmir (Santoor)

Sitar gharanas
 Etawah gharana
 Maihar gharana
 Senia gharana
 Indore gharana (Beenkar gharana)
 Atrauli-Jaipur gharana
 Mewati gharana

Sarod gharanas
 Senia-Maihar gharana
 Senia-Shahjahanpur gharana
 Lucknow-Shahjahanpur gharana
 Senia-Bangash gharana

Dance gharanas

In Kathak performers today generally draw their lineage from four major schools of Kathak: the Jaipur-Atrauli gharana, the Lucknow gharana, the Benares gharana (born in the courts of the Kachwaha Rajput kings, the Nawab of Oudh, and Varanasi respectively.) and the Raigarh gharana (born in the court of Maharaja Chakradhar Singh of Raigarh.)

The Lucknow gharana remains the most popular throughout the country. However, in recent time the Atrauli-Jaipur gharana has caught up and today most performers throughout India perform techniques belonging to both styles. With amalgamation of the techniques and poses from other dance forms, the purity of the movements and gestures may be diluted or modified along with the contemporary trends. Raigarh gharana is famous for its own distinctive composition and thousands of followers.

References

External links
Gharana database at Swarganga
Gharanas of Hindustani Music
Gharana Tradition, by Prof. R. C. Mehta

 
Hindustani music terminology
Kathak